Earth is a small, rural city in Lamb County, West Texas, United States. As of the 2010 Census, the population was 1,065.

History
Earth was established by William E. Halsell, who laid out the townsite in 1924. Originally Halsell named the city Fairlawn, but in 1925 it was renamed Earth when it was learned that there was already a town in Texas by the name of Fairlawn. In order to find a new name the townspeople sent in suggestions, and the agreed-upon best name was chosen.  The name Earth was submitted by Ora Hume (O.H.) Reeves, who became the owner of the city hotel.  Mr. Reeves' son-in-law, Frank Wesley Hyatt, was the first postmaster in Earth.

Geography and Climate
Earth is located on the high plains of the Llano Estacado.

Demographics

2020 census

As of the 2020 United States census, there were 901 people, 360 households, and 224 families residing in the city.

2000 census
As of the census of 2000, there were 1,109 people, 395 households, and 293 families residing in the city. The population density was 926.2 people per square mile (356.8/km). There were 458 housing units at an average density of 382.5 per square mile (147.4/km). The racial makeup of the city was 73.13% White, 2.89% African American, 0.81% Native American, 22.09% from other races, and 1.08% from two or more races. Hispanic or Latino of any race were 52.93% of the population.

There were 395 households, out of which 38.5% had children under the age of 18 living with them, 59.7% were married couples living together, 10.9% had a female householder with no husband present, and 25.8% were non-families. 22.8% of all households were made up of individuals, and 13.7% had someone living alone who was 65 years of age or older. The average household size was 2.81 and the average family size was 3.33.

In the city, the population was spread out, with 31.0% under the age of 18, 9.3% from 18 to 24, 23.5% from 25 to 44, 21.6% from 45 to 64, and 14.5% who were 65 years of age or older. The median age was 34 years. For every 100 females, there were 89.9 males. For every 100 females age 18 and over, there were 92.2 males.

The median income for a household in the city was $25,595, and the median income for a family was $29,688. Males had a median income of $27,396 versus $15,938 for females. The per capita income for the city was $12,191. About 20.0% of families and 27.3% of the population were below the poverty line, including 36.5% of those under age 18 and 20.8% of those age 65 or over.

Education
The City of Earth is served by the Springlake-Earth Independent School District and home to the Springlake-Earth High School Wolverines.

See also

Blackwater Draw
Plant X
Llano Estacado

References

External links
Handbook of Texas: Earth, TX

Cities in Texas
Cities in Lamb County, Texas